The Qarabağ 2013–14 season was Qarabağ's 21st Azerbaijan Premier League season, and their sixth season under manager Gurban Gurbanov. They reached the Quarterfinals of the Azerbaijan Cup, losing to Gabala, and they were crowned Champions of the Premier League. Qarabağ also competed in the 2013–14 UEFA Europa League entering at the 1st qualifying round stage. They defeated Metalurg Skopje of Macedonia, Piast Gliwice of Poland and Gefle of Sweden on their way to the playoff round where they were knocked out by Eintracht Frankfurt of Germany.

Squad 

 (captain)

Transfers

Summer

In:

 
 

 
 
 

Out:

Winter

In:

  

Out:

Competitions

Friendlies

Azerbaijan Premier League

Results summary

Results by round

Results

League table

Azerbaijan Cup

UEFA Europa League

Qualifying phase

Squad statistics

Appearances and goals

|-
|colspan="14"|Players who appeared for Qarabağ no longer at the club:

|}

Goal scorers

Disciplinary record

Notes
Qarabağ have played their home games at the Tofiq Bahramov Stadium since 1993 due to the ongoing situation in Quzanlı.
Qarabağ vs Khazar Lankaran was played at the Bakcell Arena due to the Tofiq Bahramov Stadium1 pitch being relaid.

References

Qarabag
Qarabağ FK seasons